The Symmetric hypergraph theorem is a theorem in combinatorics that puts an upper bound on the chromatic number of a graph (or hypergraph in general).  The original reference for this paper is unknown at the moment, and has been called folklore.

Statement 
A graph (or hypergraph) is called symmetric if its automorphism group is transitive.

Theorem. Let  be a symmetric hypergraph. Then

Applications 
This theorem has applications to Ramsey theory, specifically graph Ramsey theory.  Using this theorem, a relationship between the graph Ramsey numbers and the extremal numbers can be shown (see Graham-Rothschild-Spencer for the details).

See also 
 Ramsey theory

Notes 

Graph coloring
Theorems in graph theory